Prays lambda is a moth of the family Plutellidae. It is found in Japan.

The wingspan is 11–14 mm.

References

Plutellidae
Moths of Japan
Moths described in 1977